Posta is a Turkish tabloid newspaper, with the second-highest circulation in Turkey owned by Demirören Group. It was founded in 1995 by Doğan Media Group.

It began publication in 1995 and its first issue was released on 23 January. Posta had a daily circulation of approximately 516,000 in 2009. The newspaper is published in Istanbul by Doğan Holding, which also used to own (1994–2018) other major Turkish newspapers including Hürriyet.

On 21 March 2018, Demirören Group acquired the newspaper.

Editorial line
The paper's editorial line has been described as tabloid, similar to the New York Daily News or the Daily Mirror, appealing to broad audiences with more attention paid to entertainment and gossip than politics and economics.

References

External links
  

1995 establishments in Turkey
Daily newspapers published in Turkey
Doğan Media Group
Newspapers established in 1995
Newspapers published in Istanbul
Turkish-language newspapers